Beechwood is a Hudson River estate in Scarborough-on-Hudson, in Briarcliff Manor, New York. The estate was most notably the home of Frank A. Vanderlip and his family, and is a contributing property to the Scarborough Historic District. The house and property were owned by the Vanderlip family from 1906 to 1979. The property is now a 37-condominium complex as the result of a development project that began in the 1980s.

Contemporarily, Beechwood is known for being a filming location of the 1970 film House of Dark Shadows, and a filming location and the primary setting of Savages, a 1972 Merchant Ivory film. In June 2016, Money Man: Frank Vanderlip and the Birth of the Federal Reserve premiered there. The film documents Vanderlip's life and was filmed at Beechwood.

History

The first portion of the main residence dates to 1780, and includes the original kitchen's fireplace. Benjamin and Ann Folger were among the earliest residents, and named their residence "Heartt Place". In the 1830s, Folger deeded the estate to a self-proclaimed prophet, Robert Matthews, who believed himself to be the resurrected Matthias of the New Testament. Matthews persuaded his followers to fund an expansion to the house, which he had named "Zion Hill". During this time, Isabella Baumfree (Sojourner Truth) was a housekeeper to him. After he spent the money his followers and Folger had given him, Matthews became violent. Further on, he was tried for murder, and acquitted for lack of evidence. Matthews was later found guilty of assaulting his grown daughter, and he served a short jail term.

The property containing the mansion had been in the Remsen family for decades. Anna Remsen Webb was one of the inheritors of the estate. In the 1890s, her husband's half-brother Henry Walter Webb substantially added to the estate from numerous properties, including the Remsen estate and William Creighton's estate (Creighton had named his house "Beechwood" after he purchased it in 1836). Henry Webb attached the name Beechwood to the entire estate and house. He renovated and expanded the mansion, hiring R. H. Robertson to double the size of the house. Robertson designed the expansion in the Colonial Revival style, to be compatible with the neoclassical Federal style of the original but more ornate.

Frank A. Vanderlip and his wife Narcissa Cox Vanderlip purchased the  property from Webb's widow in 1906, and bought more property to make the estate a total . He hired William Welles Bosworth soon after to further enlarge the house and to design a wing for his library and the lawns of the estate. In 1907, while Vanderlip was vice president of the First National City Bank (later Citibank), he had two fluted smoked granite columns from the headquarters 55 Wall Street shipped to Beechwood (55 Wall Street was being remodeled and the columns were re-spaced, with two left over). He had the columns placed two-thirds above ground in Beechwood's entranceway off of Albany Post Road (now U.S. Route 9), an entrance which was later closed due to increasing traffic volume on Route 9 (the current entrance is off Scarborough Station Road). Vanderlip also made a cage for his children's pet rabbits using a discarded wrought-iron elevator, also discarded from the bank. Among the guests the Vanderlips hosted at the house were Woodrow Wilson, Henry Ford, Sarah Bernhardt, Annie Oakley, Franklin D. Roosevelt, John D. Rockefeller, and Isadora Duncan. The Wright Brothers even landed a plane on the property. In 1910, Vanderlip bought the nearby mansion Woodlea, although his wife prevented the family from moving, due to her preference of Beechwood over the grandiose Woodlea. Vanderlip then collaborated with other wealthy estate owners to create Sleepy Hollow Country Club, which he sold Woodlea to in 1912. In 1924, Vanderlip purchased 57 acres of Rockwood Hall's riverfront property to add to his estate. Actress-model Mary Louise Weller rented the estate in June 1973. In 1979, Vanderlip descendants sold the Beechwood property. Three condominiums were built during a transformation of the mansion in the 1980s. A later expansion resulted in a total of 37 condominiums on the property's 33 acres.

Description

Near the center of the property, at the southwest corner of Route 9 and Scarborough Station Road, sits the eponymous mansion that features two large porticoed entryways, a two-story octagonal library, numerous porches, verandas, and over 100 interior rooms. Other major structures included a hunting lodge, a second mansion built for the Vanderlips' daughter Charlotte, a home for the Vanderlips' physician, and the Scarborough School, a progressive school which the Vanderlips established just south of the mansion in 1916.

The  private parkland was designed by Frederick Law Olmsted for the Vanderlips and has expansive lawns, a grove of large beech trees, imported trees, and an Italianate garden with an alcove, fountain, and small pool with Wisteria-covered trellises. The lawns, formal gardens, and stone gazebo, erected by the Vanderlips, have been preserved and feature in wedding ceremonies that occasionally occur on the property.

The Beechwood estate also contained a carriage house, gatehouse, squash court (no longer extant), and a white-stucco artist's studio named Beech Twig, which was home to author John Cheever, whose children attended the school on the property. The family rented the house until they moved to Ossining. Descriptions of the building's interior closely match descriptions employed by Cheever in some short stories. In his youth, novelist Richard Yates also lived there, as well as other artists, writers, and composers. The estate's garage is located northeast of the mansion, and is a flat-roof, two-story concrete building dating to the early 1900s.

See also 
 Scarborough School

References

External links

Olmsted Brothers images

Briarcliff Manor, New York
Houses in Westchester County, New York
Parks in Westchester County, New York
Historic district contributing properties in New York (state)
National Register of Historic Places in Westchester County, New York
U.S. Route 9
Colonial Revival architecture in New York (state)
Federal architecture in New York (state)
Gilded Age mansions